In Greek mythology, Clytus (Ancient Greek: Κλύτος) is a name that may refer to:
Clytus, a Trojan soldier who killed three Greeks in the Trojan War.
Clytus, a warrior killed by Perseus in the battle against Phineus.
Clytus, a son of Aegyptus who was killed by the Danaid Autodice.
Clytus, a son of Temenus and his successor as king of Argos.
Clytus, a son of the Athenian Pallas, who, together with his brother Butes, is sent alongside Cephalus to Aeacus to ask for assistance against Minos.

Notes

References 

 Gaius Julius Hyginus, Fabulae from The Myths of Hyginus translated and edited by Mary Grant. University of Kansas Publications in Humanistic Studies. Online version at the Topos Text Project.
 Publius Ovidius Naso, Metamorphoses translated by Brookes More (1859-1942). Boston, Cornhill Publishing Co. 1922. Online version at the Perseus Digital Library.
 Publius Ovidius Naso, Metamorphoses. Hugo Magnus. Gotha (Germany). Friedr. Andr. Perthes. 1892. Latin text available at the Perseus Digital Library.

Trojans
Mythology of Argos